Ceryx sphenodes is a moth of the subfamily Arctiinae. It was described by Edward Meyrick in 1886. It is found in New Guinea and Queensland, Australia.

References

Ceryx (moth)
Moths described in 1886